Sebuku or Seboekoe can refer to either of the following islands.
Sebuku (Sumatra), located near the island of Sumatra
Sebuku (Borneo), located near the island of Borneo